Linnea Johanna Hedin (born 24 January 1995) is a Swedish ice hockey player and member of the Swedish national team, currently playing in the Swedish Women's Hockey League (SDHL) with AIK Hockey Dam. She represented Sweden at the IIHF Women's World Championships in 2012 and 2013.  Hedin played NCAA ice hockey with the Minnesota Duluth Bulldogs women's ice hockey program during 2014 to 2018.

References

External links 
 

Living people
1995 births
Swedish women's ice hockey defencemen
AIK Hockey Dam players
Minnesota Duluth Bulldogs women's ice hockey players
University of Minnesota Duluth alumni
Swedish expatriate ice hockey players in the United States
Ice hockey people from Stockholm